Tulja Bhavani Temple (Marathi: श्री क्षेत्र तुळजा भवानी देवस्थान) is a Hindu temple dedicated to goddess Bhavani (goddess Parvati), also referred to as Durga and Sati. It is located in Tuljapur in Dharashiv district of Maharashtra, India, and is considered as one of the 51 Shakti Pithas. It is situated 45 km from Solapur. The temple was built in 12th century CE by Maratha Mahamandaleshwara Māradadeva of the Kadamb dynasty. The management and priestly rights of the temple are held by the Palikar Bhope clan, the descendants of Māradadeva. Goddess Tulja Bhavani is known by the names Tulaja, Turaja, Tvarita, Durga, Parvati, Tripura Sundari ,Bhagawati,Amba (Mother of the Vedas) and Jagadambaa (Mother of the Universe) in different regions.

Background
Tulja Bhavani is a form of goddess Parvati, who is worshipped in Maharashtra, and also by people of Telangana, Northern Karnataka, and Nepal. "Bhavani" literally translates to "giver of life", meaning the power of nature or the source of creative energy. She is considered to be a mother who provides to her devotees and also plays the role of dispensing justice by killing Asuras. 

Shivaji, the founder of the Maratha kingdom, was reputed to frequently visit this temple to seek blessings. The history of the temple dates back to the days of ' Skanda Purana ' as it finds a mention in that holy script. According to the epic story, there was a sage "Kardam" and his consort "Anubhuthi’ with an infant, in this area. After his death his wife "Anubhuthi" performed a penance for goddess in the name of Bhavani on the banks of the river "Mandakini" to look after her child. There was a demon (Rakshasa) by name "Kukur" who tortured her. Then Goddess Bhavani rescued Anubhuthi and killed the demon. The goddess on the prayer of her pet devotee settled on the hill of "Bala Ghat". Since then the Mother Goddess came to be called as Bhavani of Tuljapur or Tulja Bhavani.

Mother Goddess Bhavani temple is the place where Chhatrapati Shivaji was blessed by Matha Bhavani. It is situated at Tuljapur as such it is popularly known as Tulja Bhavani Temple in many districts of Maharashtra. It is one of the 51 Shakti Peetas attributed to Goddess Parvati. The second among the 'Shaktipeetas' is Goddess Bhavani at Tuljapur.
Bhavani is one who gives life and source of original power.

Tuljapur is at 45 km from Solapur. Historically this temple was built in the 12th century CE. There is yet another Tulja Bhavani temple built in 1537-1540 in Chhattisgarh. There is a third temple of Tulja Bhavani in the village of Patnakuva Gandhinagar in Gujarat. According to the priest, this Goddess came here from Tuljapur during 14th century. The Goddess is said to be swayambhu (self emanated). It is true that God or Goddess is always referred as ‘swayambhu’ in Vedas, Puranas and many legends. But it does not refer to the stone idol installed in a temple. What is attributed is to the invisible Supreme power.

The second among the 'Shaktipeeths' is Tulja Bhavani of Tuljapur. It is the family deity of the Bhosale Royal family, the Yadavs and of countless numbers of families belonging to different castes. The great ruler and founder of the Maratha kingdom, Chatrapati Shivaji visited the temple as he was a prominent devotee of her, people believe that the Goddess gifted him a sword - 'The Bhawani Talwar' - to succeed in his expeditions. Tulaja word indicates to an old Hindu monastery at Tolaja village in the present Rawalpindi division of Pakistan.

Temple 

Along with temples of Renuka at Mahur, Mahalaxmi at Kolhapur, and Saptashringi at Vani, the temple of Bhavani at Tuljapur forms the four great Shaktipitha in Maharashtra.
Many legends are associated with the temple. One legend involves a demon, Madhu-Kaitabh, who was wreaking havoc upon both the gods and humans. Unable to find any solution, they turned to Lord Brahma for help, who advised them to turn to the Goddess Shakti. She took up the form of a destroyer, and powered by the other (Sapta) Mata Varaahi, Brahmi, Vaishnavi, Kaumaari Indraani, and Saambhavi, vanquished the demon and restored peace. Legend also states that Bhavani finished another demon that had taken up the disguise of a buffalo (Mahisha), and took shelter on the Yamunachala Hill which is part of Balaghat mountain range. The Tuljabhawani temple is located on this hill. Another legend mentions the story of a sage known as "Kardam" After his death his wife "Anubuti" had performed a penance at the banks of river "mandakini " for Bhavani mata to look after her infant child. While performing the penance the demon known "Kukur" tried to disturb her penance during which the Goddess came to the aid of "Anubuti" and killed the demon "Kukur". From that day onwards the Goddess Bhavani came to be known as Tulja Bhavani.

The main entrance of the temple bears the name of Sardar Nimbalkar. The other two entrances are named after the parents of Chhatrapati Shivaji, Shahaji and Jijabai. As one enters the Sardar Nimbalkar entrance, there is a temple dedicated to Markandeya Rishi on the right. After descending the stairs, one sees the main Tulja Temple. There is yagna kund (Holy fire pit) in front of this temple. On the floor near two main gates (Raja Shahaji Mahadwar and Rajmata Jijau main gate), there are two libraries named, Shree Santh Dnyaneshwar Dharmik Library and Shree Tukaram Dharmik Library. After alighting from the stairs, there is `Gomukh Theerth` on the right side and `Kalakh`, also known as `Kallol Theerth` on the left side. Before entering the sanctum sanctorum of the Goddess, devotees take a dip here in these theerths (Shallow tanks of  "holy" water). There are also Amruth Kund and a Datta temple on the premises. A Siddhi Vinayak temple is situated on the left side of the main gate whilst on the right, there is a temple of Aadishakti, Aadimata Matangadevi. A temple of goddess Annapurna is also present in the main complex.

The idol of Goddess Tulja Bhawani is believed by her devotees to be `swayambhu` ("self-manifested" or "that which is created by its own accord"). The high granite idol is three-foot tall, with eight arms holding weapons, and bearing the head of the slain demon Mahishasura. The Goddess is also known as Tulaja, Turaja, Tvarita and Amba.

The Goddess is kuldevi (clan goddess) for Maratha clans of Maharashtra. The Goddess is either revered by or is the Family Deity for many castes including Dhangar,Mali, Deshastha Brahmin, Bharbhunja, Burud, Kolhati, Gavli, Jogi, Johar, San Teli, Gavandi, Pangul, Sonar, Lonari, Kasar, Bhute, Kalar, Aagri and Koli.

Adi maya Adi shakti temple is the temple north to the Tuljabhavani temple. First this pooja starts, and is then followed by the pooja of Tuljabhavani which then takes place.

Temple management
The day-to-day affairs of the temple are looked after by the trust which is headed by the District Collector. The board of trustees include the deputy collector, the member representing Tuljapur in Maharashtra Legislative Assembly (MLA), the town Mayor (Nagaradhyaksha), and the Tahsildar.

Worship and rituals
The temple follow a set of elaborate rituals for the deity.These include priests offering a daily ritual bath, change of clothes, and offering food to the deity four times a day.The daily routine also includes offering devotional prayers to the Goddess. In the evening the deity is ceremoniously put to rest.On special occasions such as the birthday, marriage, in addition to ritual bath, the idol of the Goddess is taken around Tuljapur in a procession.

Temple Priests
Unlike brahmin or gurav priests at other temples in Maharashtra, the main priests of the Bhavani temple are from the Maratha 16 aane Kadam - Bhope clan, who offer services to the pilgrims.Pilgrims usually have longstanding relationship with a particular pujari family who serve as the host for the pilgrims by providing accommodation,food, ritual offering to the deity such as saris,sari blouse pieces (khan in Marathi language), bangles, coconut, vermillion, turmeric, puffed rice, flower garlands, and prasad (ritual food for the deity).The prasad can be vegetarian or at times of meat from a sacrificed goat.

The priests of two other temples, Matangi and Adimaya, in the same temple complex belong to the Mahar community.

Animal sacrifice
On the Khandenavami, the ninth day of the autumn Navratri festival and Dussera, goats are sacrificed in honour of the goddess. The actual sacrificial slaughter is carried out by the Mahar community for both the Bhavani temple as well as the Matangi temple.

See also

 Dharashiv Caves
 Bhavani

References

External links
 

Shakti Peethas
Hindu temples in Maharashtra
Tourist attractions in Osmanabad district
Hindu temples practicing animal sacrifice